Viktorija Golubic was the defending champion, but chose not to participate.

Beatriz Haddad Maia won the title, defeating Grace Min in the final, 6–2, 3–6, 6–1.

Seeds

Main draw

Finals

Top half

Bottom half

References 
 Main draw

Waco Showdown - Singles